The 2019–20 season will be the club's 1st season back in the Scottish Premiership, the top flight of Scottish football, after being promoted as Champions from the Scottish Championship. Ross County will also competed in the League Cup and the Scottish Cup.

Results & fixtures

Pre-season

Scottish Premiership

Scottish League Cup

Scottish Cup

Squad statistics

Appearances
As of 8 March 2020

|-
|colspan="10"|Players who left the club during the season
|-

|-
|}

Goalscorers

Team statistics

League table

League Cup table

Transfers

In

Out

See also
 List of Ross County F.C. seasons

Notes and references

Ross County F.C. seasons
Ross County